The Red Bull RB10 is a Formula One racing car designed by Adrian Newey for Infiniti Red Bull Racing to compete in the 2014 Formula One season. It was driven by reigning World Drivers' Champion Sebastian Vettel and Daniel Ricciardo, who was promoted from sister team Scuderia Toro Rosso after Mark Webber announced his retirement from the sport at the end of the 2013 season. The RB10 was designed to use Renault Sport's new 1.6-litre V6 turbocharged engine, the Renault Energy F1-2014.

The car was launched on 28 January 2014 at the Circuito de Jerez. Keeping with the tradition of naming his race cars, Sebastian Vettel named the RB10 as "Suzie".

The RB10 driven by Daniel Ricciardo throughout the season is currently on display at The Motor Museum of Western Australia.

Design and development
The team—like fellow Renault-powered outfits Scuderia Toro Rosso and Caterham—were affected first by problems with the physical Renault Energy F1-2014 unit that prevented the individual components of the power unit from working together. Once these issues were resolved, the team experienced problems with the software governing the turbo unit. Red Bull also suffered from unique problems arising from the tight packaging of the RB10 chassis, which caused temperatures within the car to climb so high that parts started to burn.

Although Sebastian Vettel was able to complete over seventy laps of the circuit on the first of four days of testing, the team completed less than forty more over the remaining three days as the chassis was further plagued by mechanical issues. As the test ended, Red Bull had completed fewer laps than any other team save for Lotus and Marussia, and the fastest times recorded by Vettel and Daniel Ricciardo were outside 107% of the fastest time recorded during the test; had the test been treated as a qualifying session, neither Vettel nor Ricciardo would have qualified for a race.

The final test of the season—also held in Bahrain—was little better; although Ricciardo recorded the car's fastest lap time, it was still two and a half seconds slower than the fastest lap time recorded by Felipe Massa. When Vettel returned to the car, he failed to complete a lap before the car broke down, and team principal Christian Horner admitted the team had no idea when the problems with the car would be fixed.

Season summary
A second-place finish for Ricciardo was stripped due to illegal fuel flow throughout the race. Despite warnings from officials throughout the race, Red Bull used their own fuel flow system rather than the mandated FIA item, claiming the FIA unit was faulty.

Vettel was able to achieve third place in Malaysia, though a botched pit stop and front wing damage forced Ricciardo to retire from the race. Ricciardo repeated a third place podium finish in Monaco, managing to hound Lewis Hamilton in a battle for second after the latter had problems with his vision. Conversely, Vettel retired early on due to power unit issues.

The RB10 took its first win of the 2014 season when Ricciardo won the seventh race of the season, in Canada. The win was also Ricciardo's first in Formula One, while Vettel was also able to record his second podium finish of the season, finishing in third place. Red Bull were not able to repeat a great result at its home race in Austria, with Ricciardo finishing in eighth, and Vettel retiring for the third time, due to a lack of power, and later front wing damage. Ricciardo and Vettel bounced back to place third and fifth, respectively in Britain.

Ricciardo gave the RB10 its second and third wins at the Hungarian and the Belgian Grands Prix respectively. The team finished second in the Constructors' Championship, with Ricciardo finishing third in the Drivers' Championship, beating Vettel, who finished fifth.

At the final race of the season in Abu Dhabi, the Red Bulls were excluded from qualifying for having a front wing which was over the wing flex limits. As a result, the Red Bull cars were sent to the back of the grid. The team was, however, able to claw back a decent result with Daniel Ricciardo finishing fourth and the departing Sebastian Vettel finishing in eighth place.

Complete Formula One results
(key) (results in italics indicate fastest lap)

‡ — Teams and drivers scored double points at the Abu Dhabi Grand Prix.

References

Red Bull Formula One cars
2014 Formula One season cars